The Government Accountability Project (GAP) is a nonprofit whistleblower protection and advocacy organization in the United States. It was founded in 1977.

Activities
In 1992, GAP represented Aldric Saucier, who had lost his job and security clearance after he criticized the Strategic Defense Initiative.

In December 2012, Eric Ben-Artzi came forward publicly with evidence of multi-billion dollar securities violations at his employer, Deutsche Bank. He internally reported violations stemming from the bank's failure to report the value of its credit derivatives portfolio accurately. The bank retaliated in multiple ways and ultimately dismissed him. GAP filed an official whistleblower complaint on Ben-Artzi's behalf. He was ultimately awarded $8 million from the SEC, which he declined to collect.

GAP provided legal support to Thomas A. Drake, a former senior executive with the National Security Agency (NSA) who blew the whistle on multi-billion dollar programmatic fraud, waste, and abuse; the critical loss and suppression of 9/11 intelligence; and the Stellar Wind project's dragnet electronic mass surveillance and data-mining (conducted on a vast scale by the agency with the approval of the White House after 9/11). Drake argued that Stellar Wind violated the Constitution and American citizens' civil liberties while weakening national security. In April 2010, the Department of Justice charged him with ten felonies (five under the Espionage Act) and he faced 35 years in prison. He was the first whistleblower charged with espionage by the Obama administration. All charges were eventually dropped when Drake pleaded to a misdemeanor count of exceeding the authorized use of a government computer with no fine or prison time.

In 2003, Federal Air Marshal (FAM) Robert MacLean revealed a cost-cutting plan to cancel FAM coverage from long distance flights on the eve of a confirmed al-Qaeda suicidal hijacking plan. The plan never went into effect after Congress protested, based solely on his whistleblowing disclosure. TSA fired him three years later with a single charge of "Unauthorized Disclosure of Sensitive Security Information" – an unclassified "hybrid secrecy" label the TSA retroactively applied to the information that he disclosed.

Jim Schrier is a veteran food safety inspector for the United States Department of Agriculture (USDA) who was retaliated against after blowing the whistle on violations of humane handling regulations at an agency-regulated Tyson Foods slaughter plant in Iowa. Serving as an inspector for 29 years, Schrier reported clear humane handling violations involving market hogs to his supervisor, including inadequate stunning techniques and that conscious animals were being shackled and slaughtered.

In early 2013, whistleblower Edward Snowden began working with journalists to reveal widespread mass surveillance programs conducted by the National Security Agency. Articles based on Snowden's documents have revealed the existence of numerous global surveillance programs run by the NSA with the cooperation of telecommunication companies and other governments. In 2013, the existence of the NSA metadata program was revealed, along with Boundless Informant, the PRISM electronic data mining program, the XKeyscore analytical tool, the Tempora interception project, the MUSCULAR access point and the massive FASCIA database, which contains trillions of device-location records. In 2014, Britain's Joint Threat Research Intelligence Group was revealed, along with the Dishfire database, Squeaky Dolphin's real-time monitoring of social media networks, and the bulk collection of private webcam images via the Optic Nerve program. In June 2013, Snowden became the eighth whistleblower charged under the Espionage Act by the Obama administration.

As an officer at the U.N. peacekeeping operation in Kosovo in 2007, James Wasserstrom blocked an alleged conspiracy to pay a $500 million kickback to senior U.N. and Kosovo officials in connection with the construction of a new coal mine and power plant. The UN Dispute Tribunal (UNDT) found he was subjected to serious and protracted retaliation which he faced without protection from the U.N. Ethics Office – the unit established to investigate and act against such reprisals. Wasserstrom faced relentless negative personal and professional consequences of the retaliation, while none of those who engaged in it suffered consequences themselves. He has since lobbied Congress successfully to strengthen State Department oversight of UN whistleblower protections.

In early 2007, Government Accountability Project was responsible for exposing fraud and abuse at the highest levels of the World Bank. In May 2007, World Bank President Paul Wolfowitz left the international organization in the wake of wide-ranging scandals based on multiple releases of documents over the previous two months by Government Accountability Project.

Government Accountability Project released evidence or exposed information showing that: Wolfowitz's companion, Shaha Riza, received salary raises far in excess of those allowable under Bank rules; Riza received a questionable consulting position with a U.S. defense contractor in 2003 at Wolfowitz' direction that has resulted in State and Defense Department inquiries; Juan José Daboub, Bank Managing Director and Wolfowitz-hire, attempted to remove references and funding for "family planning" in Bank projects; Wolfowitz' office was responsible for weakening a "climate change" strategy document; Bank Senior Management delayed reporting to Bank staff that a fellow staffer had been seriously wounded in a shooting in Iraq; World Bank lending to Africa during Fiscal Year of 2007 has plummeted; and Wolfowitz was trying to broaden the Bank's portfolio in Iraq over Board opposition.

The Democracy Protection Initiative 
The Democracy Protection Initiative was launched by the Government Accountability Project in October 2020. The initiative aimed to encourage and provide support to whistleblowers who came forward with information relating to alleged interference in the 2020 United States elections and during a potential subsequent transition of power. Partners in the initiative included the American Constitution Society, American Oversight, Citizens for Responsibility and Ethics in Washington, Georgetown Law's Institute for Constitutional Advocacy and Protection, Protect Democracy, Public Citizen, and We The Action.

Legislation
Government Accountability Project advocated in favor of the All Circuit Review Extension Act (H.R. 4197; 113th Congress), a bill that would extend for three years the authority for federal employees who appeal a judgment of the Merit Systems Protection Board (MSPB) to file their appeal at any federal court, instead of only the U.S. Court of Appeals. The pilot program was established in the Whistleblower Protection Enhancement Act of 2012 (WPEA) to last only two years. Government Accountability Project calls the program "landmark" and says that it was "the WPEA's most significant structural reform." Government Accountability Project argued that an extension of the pilot program was needed in order to ensure that the Government Accountability Office (GAO) and Congress had enough time to see the results of the program before deciding whether to make it permanent.

References

External links

 
 Government Accountability Project footage on C-SPAN

Whistleblower support organizations
Non-profit organizations based in Washington, D.C.
Organizations established in 1977